Gissur Thorvaldsson (1208 – 12 January 1268;;) was a medieval Icelandic chieftain or goði of the Haukdælir family clan, and great-grandson of Jón Loftsson.

Gissur played a major role in the period of civil war which is now known as Age of the Sturlungs: he fought alongside Kolbeinn the Young against the forces of Sturla Sighvatsson of the Sturlungar clan in the Battle of Örlygsstaðir in 1238 and led the force of men who murdered saga-writer Snorri Sturluson in 1241, at the behest of Haakon IV, King of Norway. In 1258, he was made Earl of Iceland for his loyal service to the king. He held this title until his death.

Gissur worked actively to promote the Old Covenant, an agreement which brought Iceland under the sovereignty of the Norwegian crown in 1264. The covenant is hence sometimes known as Gissur's Covenant, or Gissurarsáttmáli.

1208 births
1268 deaths
Gissur Thorvaldsson
Norwegian earls
Goðar